Envy is a Japanese screamo band formed in Tokyo, in 1992. They are signed to Rock Action Records in Europe and Temporary Residence Limited in North America, though originally they worked with Level Plane Records. Initially influential in the post-hardcore and screamo scenes, Envy soon began to employ elements of post-rock in their work as well.

They have released 7 studio albums to date (with the most recent being The Fallen Crimson), as well as several EPs and splits, most notably with Jesu and American post-hardcore band Thursday. Original member and vocalist Tetsuya Fukagawa left Envy in 2016.

On February 6, 2018, Envy announced a new lineup consisting of Tsuyoshi Yoshitake, Yoshimitsu Taki, and Hiroki Watanabe. A Japanese press release added that two members had left the band, and founding guitarist and drummer Masahiro Tobita and Dairoku Seki were no longer listed as members on the band's Facebook page or website.

On April 1, 2018, Tetsuya Fukagawa surprise-rejoined Envy on stage for the first time in two and a half years, cementing his return to the band. This was subsequently confirmed via the band's official social media pages.

Members
Current
Nobukata Kawai — guitar (1992–present)
Manabu Nakagawa — bass (1992–present)
Tetsuya Fukagawa — vocals, programming (1992-2016, 2018–present)
Tsuyoshi "Yoshi" Yoshitake — guitar (2018–present)
Yoshimitsu Taki — guitar (2018–present)
Hiroki Watanabe — drums (2018–present)

Past
Masahiro Tobita — guitar (1992–2018)
Dairoku Seki — drums (1992–2018)

Discography

Studio albums
From Here to Eternity LP/CD (H.G. Fact) (1998)
All the Footprints You've Ever Left and the Fear Expecting Ahead LP/CD (H.G. Fact/Molaire Industries/Dim Mak/Rock Action) (2001)
A Dead Sinking Story CD/2xLP (Sonzai/Level Plane/Nova Recordings/Rock Action) (2003)
Insomniac Doze LP/CD (Sonzai) (2006)
Recitation LP/CD (Sonzai/Temporary Residence Limited/Rock Action) (2010)
Atheist's Cornea LP/CD (Sonzai/Temporary Residence Limited) (2015)
The Fallen Crimson LP/CD (Temporary Residence Limited/Pelagic Records) (2020)

EPs
Breathing and Dying in This Place CD (H.G. Fact) (1996)
Angel's Curse Whispered in the Edge of Despair LP/CD (H.G. Fact) (1999)
The Eyes of Single Eared Prophet CD (H.G. Fact) (2000)
Burning Out the Memories 10" (Molaire Industries) (2000)
Abyssal EP/CD (Sonzai) (2007)
Definition of Impossibility (Pelagic Records) (2019)
 Seimei (2022)

Splits
Split 7" with Sixpence (H.G. Fact) (1997)
Split 7" with Endeavor (H.G. Fact) (1997)
Split 7" with This Machine Kills (H.G. Fact) (2000)
Split CD with Iscariote (Waiting for an Angel/Sonzai/Level Plane; 10" released by Pure Pain Sugar/Code Of Ethics) (2002)
Split CD with Yaphet Kotto and This Machine Kills (Sonzai) (2003)
"Envy/Jesu" LP/CD (Daymare Recordings) (2008)
"Thursday / Envy" LP/CD (Temporary Residence Limited) (2008)

7"s
Eyes of Final Proof (H.G. Fact) (2000)
Last Wish (H.G. Fact) (2001)

Singles
"As Serenity Calls Your Name" (Sonzai) (2011)
Alnair in August (2018)

DVDs
Transfovista DVD (Sonzai) (2007)

Compilations
Far East Hardcore Comp LP/CD (Got's Pop/Slam Records)
Platform Comp 7" (Never Shown Face)
No Fate Comp CD (H.G. Fact)
For Ugly For Beautiful Vol. 3 Comp CD (Lunch Service Records)
Lucky Thirteen Comp LP (Nova Recordings)
Compiled Fragments 1997-2003 CD (Sonzai/Temporary Residence Limited) (2005)
 Destroy Independent Music! (2006–2007, Temporary Residence Limited) sampler
Invariable Will, Recurring Ebbs and Flows 14 LPs + DVD (Temporary Residence Limited) (2013)

References

External links
official Envy band page
Official Envy page on the Sonzai Records website (archive)
Envy profile on Punknews.org
Envy's songs' meanings
Envy's Official Myspace page
Punknews.org Interview
Envy's last.fm page

Japanese emo musical groups
Japanese hardcore punk groups
Japanese post-rock groups
Musical groups established in 1992
Musical quintets
Post-hardcore groups
Screamo musical groups
Musical groups from Tokyo
Temporary Residence Limited artists
Level Plane Records artists
Rock Action Records artists